Archibald Smith of Jordanhill  (10 August 1813, in Greenhead, North Lanarkshire – 26 December 1872, in London) was a Scots-born barrister and amateur mathematician.

Early life and education
He was the only son of James Smith FRSE (1782-1867), a wealthy merchant and antiquary and owner of the Jordanhill estate in Glasgow, and his wife Mary Wilson, granddaughter of Alexander Wilson, professor of astronomy in Glasgow University (and brother of Patrick Wilson). He was educated at the Redland School near Bristol from 1826 to 1828.

Archibald studied law at Glasgow University from 1828, and then at Trinity College, Cambridge, where he was Senior Wrangler, said to be the first Scot to achieve this position, and first Smith's prizeman in 1836, elected a fellow of Trinity College.  He was one of the founders of the Cambridge Mathematical Journal. He graduated BA in 1836 and MA in 1839.

Career as lawyer
He entered Lincoln's Inn, and was called to the bar as a barrister in 1841. He then practised as an equity draughtsman and property lawyer in London.

Career as scientist
His scientific work was mainly in the field of applications of magnetism and the Earth's magnetic field. He obtained practical formulae for the correction of magnetic compass observations made on board ship, which General Sir Edward Sabine published in the Transactions of the Royal Society: Smith later made convenient tables.  In 1859 he edited William Scoresby's Journal of a Voyage to Australia for Magnetical Research and gave an exact formula for the effect of the iron of a ship on the compass. In 1862, in conjunction with the hydrographer Sir Frederick John Owen Evans FRS (1815-1885), then superintendent of the compass department of the navy, he published an Admiralty Manual for ascertaining and applying the Deviations of the Compass caused by the Iron in a Ship.

He was elected a Fellow of the Royal Society of Edinburgh in 1837 his proposer being James David Forbes. Elected a Fellow of the Royal Society in June 1856, he was awarded its Royal Medal in 1865 "for his papers in the Philosophical Transactions and elsewhere, on the magnetism of ships".  In 1866 Emperor Alexander II of Russia presented him with a gold compass, set in diamonds, and emblazoned with the Imperial Arms.

He died in London on 26 December 1872.

Personal life
In 1853, Smith married Susan Emma Parker, daughter of Sir James Parker of Rothley Temple, Leicestershire, and Mary Babington. They had six sons and two daughters:

James Parker Smith FRSE (1854–1929) M.P. for Partick, Lanarkshire
Rev. Walter Edward Smith (1855–1940), vicar at Andover
Lt. Com. Charles Stewart Smith (1859–1934)], Royal Navy officer, British Diplomat
Arthur Hamilton Smith (1860–1941), museum curator and archaeologist
Sir Henry Babington Smith (1863–1923), prominent civil servant and banker
Mary Susan Smith (1865–1915)
Margaret Smith  (1867–1904)
Brig. Gen. George Edward Smith (1868–1944)

Notes

References

 Obituary notice by "W.T." (Lord Kelvin), Proceedings of the Royal Society 22 (1873-1874) pp. 1-xxiv  (the first known occurrence of the phrase harmonic analysis is on p.vi )

1813 births
1872 deaths
Alumni of the University of Glasgow
Alumni of Trinity College, Cambridge
Fellows of Trinity College, Cambridge
19th-century British mathematicians
Scottish mathematicians
Members of Lincoln's Inn
Fellows of the Royal Society of Edinburgh
Fellows of the Royal Society
Royal Medal winners
Senior Wranglers